The Very Best of... Sting & The Police is a compilation album issued by A&M Records on 17 November 1997, containing a mix of Police songs and Sting's solo works. It originally featured one new track, a remix of the 1978 song "Roxanne" by rap artist Sean "Puffy" Combs. The album was reissued in 1998 by PolyGram International with "Russians" removed and three added tracks: "Seven Days", "Fragile", and "De Do Do Do, De Da Da Da".

In 2002, it was again re-released by Universal with several track changes: the songs "Let Your Soul Be Your Pilot", "Russians", and "Roxanne '97 (Puff Daddy Remix)" are omitted, with the songs "Brand New Day", "Desert Rose", and "So Lonely" in their place.

Track listing

A&M (1997)
"Message in a Bottle" – 4:49 from Reggatta de Blanc
"Can't Stand Losing You" – 2:58 from Outlandos d'Amour
"Englishman in New York" – 4:25 from ...Nothing Like the Sun
"Every Breath You Take" – 4:13 from Synchronicity
"Walking on the Moon" – 4:59 from Reggatta de Blanc
"Fields of Gold" – 3:40 from Ten Summoner's Tales
"Every Little Thing She Does Is Magic" – 4:20 from Ghost in the Machine
"If You Love Somebody Set Them Free" – 4:14 from The Dream of the Blue Turtles
"Let Your Soul Be Your Pilot" (Edit) 4:29 from Mercury Falling
"Russians" – 3:57 from The Dream of the Blue Turtles
"If I Ever Lose My Faith in You" – 4:29 from Ten Summoner's Tales
"When We Dance" (Edit) – 4:17 from Fields of Gold: The Best of Sting 1984–1994
"Don't Stand So Close to Me" – 4:03 from Zenyatta Mondatta
"Roxanne" – 3:12 from Outlandos d'Amour
"Roxanne '97" (Puff Daddy Remix) – 4:33 Previously unreleased

PolyGram International (1998)
"Message in a Bottle" – 4:49 from Reggatta de Blanc
"Can't Stand Losing You" – 2:58 from Outlandos d'Amour
"Englishman in New York" – 4:25 from ...Nothing Like the Sun
"Every Breath You Take" – 4:13 from Synchronicity
"Seven Days" – 4:39 from Ten Summoner's Tales
"Walking on the Moon" – 4:59 from Reggatta de Blanc
"Fields of Gold" – 3:40 from Ten Summoner's Tales
"Fragile" – 3:54 from ...Nothing Like the Sun
"Every Little Thing She Does Is Magic" – 4:20 from Ghost in the Machine
"De Do Do Do, De Da Da Da" – 4:09 from Zenyatta Mondatta
"If You Love Somebody Set Them Free" – 4:14 from The Dream of the Blue Turtles
"Let Your Soul Be Your Pilot (Edit)" from Mercury Falling
"If I Ever Lose My Faith in You" – 4:29 from Ten Summoner's Tales
"When We Dance (Edit)" – 4:17 from Fields of Gold: The Best of Sting 1984–1994
"Don't Stand So Close to Me" – 4:03 from Zenyatta Mondatta
"Roxanne" – 3:12 from Outlandos d'Amour
"Roxanne '97" (Puff Daddy Remix) – 4:33 Previously unreleased

Japanese version bonus single
"De Do Do Do, De Da Da Da" (Japanese version)

Universal (2002)
 "Message in a Bottle" – 4:50
 "Can't Stand Losing You" – 3:00
 "Englishman in New York" – 4:28
 "Every Breath You Take" – 4:12
 "Seven Days" – 4:39
 "Walking on the Moon" – 5:03
 "Fields of Gold" – 3:40
 "Fragile" – 3:54
 "Every Little Thing She Does Is Magic" – 4:21
 "De Do Do Do, De Da Da Da" – 4:08
 "If You Love Somebody Set Them Free" – 4:15
 "Brand New Day" – 6:22
 "Desert Rose" featuring Cheb Mami – 4:47
 "If I Ever Lose My Faith in You" – 4:30
 "When We Dance" – 4:18
 "Don't Stand So Close to Me" – 4:00
 "Roxanne" – 3:10
 "So Lonely" – 4:47

Additional personnel
"Roxanne '97" (Puff Daddy Remix)
Pras – rap vocals
Full Force – background vocals

Production
 Dave Collins – mastering

Charts

Weekly charts

Year-end charts

Certifications

References

1997 greatest hits albums
Albums produced by Hugh Padgham
Sting (musician) compilation albums
The Police compilation albums
Split albums
A&M Records compilation albums
Albums produced by Sean Combs